The Irish Albums Chart is the Irish music industry standard albums popularity chart issued weekly by the Irish Recorded Music Association (IRMA). The charts were previously compiled on behalf of IRMA by Chart-Track, and have been compiled by the Official Charts Company since 2017. Chart rankings are based on sales, which are compiled through over-the-counter retail data captured electronically each day from retailers' Point of sale systems and certain digital retailers. All major record stores and over forty independents submit data for the charts, accounting for over 80% of the market, according to Chart-Track. A new chart is compiled and released to the public by the Irish Recorded Music Association on Friday at noon. Each chart is dated with the "week-ending" date of the previous Thursday (i.e., the day before issue).

It is released as a Top 100; however, Chart-Track's records only record the Top 75 in the archives.

Chart achievements and trivia

Albums with the most weeks at number one

Acts to occupy the top two positions
Michael Jackson – The Essential Michael Jackson and Number Ones (two weeks in July 2009).
Adele – 21 and 19 (one week in March 2011).
Ed Sheeran – ÷ and x (two weeks in March 2017 and one week in August 2017).

See also
Lists of Irish Albums Chart number ones
Irish Independent Albums Chart

References

Albums Chart